Jukka Veltheim (born 18 June 1984) is a Finnish football player currently playing for FC Lahti.

See also
Football in Finland
List of football clubs in Finland

References

External links
FC Lahti Profile
Guardian Football
Veikkausliiga Hall of Fame
Palloverkko

1984 births
Living people
FC Lahti players
Veikkausliiga players
Finnish footballers
Finnish expatriate footballers
Expatriate footballers in the Maldives
New Radiant S.C. players
Place of birth missing (living people)
Association football midfielders